Kwon Bo-ah (born November 5, 1986), known professionally as BoA, is a South Korean singer, songwriter, dancer, producer and actress. One of the most successful and influential Korean entertainers, she has been dubbed the "Queen of K-pop."

Born and raised in Gyeonggi-do, South Korea, BoA was discovered by SM Entertainment talent agents when she accompanied her older brother, a music video director, to a talent search in 1998. She was trained for two years and made her debut in August 2000. BoA has released twenty studio albums, including ten in Korean, nine in Japanese, and one in English. On television, she appeared as a judge on the reality competition show K-pop Star (2011–2013), as an actress on the television drama Listen to Love (2016), as a host for the second season of Produce 101 (2017), and as a coach for the third season of The Voice of Korea (2020).

BoA's ability to sing in Japanese, English and Mandarin helped her find commercial success beyond South Korea, in China, Japan, Taiwan, and Singapore. With the release of her debut Japanese studio album, Listen to My Heart (2002), BoA became the first South Korean pop star to break through in Japan following the fall of barriers that had restricted the import and export of entertainment between the countries since the end of World War II. She is the only foreign artist with three albums that have sold more than one million copies in Japan and one of only three female artists with six consecutive number-one studio albums on the Oricon charts since her debut, the others being Japanese singers Ayumi Hamasaki and Hikaru Utada.

Career

2000–2003: Debut and commercial success in South Korea and Japan 
At the age of eleven, BoA accompanied her older brother to an SM Entertainment talent search. Though her brother was the one who auditioned as a break-dancer, SM talent scouts instead took notice of BoA and offered her a contract on the same night as the auditions. Her parents initially opposed the notion of BoA leaving school to enter the entertainment business but eventually consented at her older brothers' persuasion. She has said that her early influence as a singer was Seo Taiji.

BoA underwent two years of training (involving vocal, dance, English, and Japanese lessons), and at the age of thirteen she released her debut album ID; Peace B in South Korea on August 25, 2000. The album was moderately successful; it entered the Top 10 of the South Korean charts and sold around 156,000 units. Meanwhile, her Korean record label, SM Entertainment, made arrangements with Japanese label Avex Trax to launch her music career in Japan. She was forced to quit school to prepare and in early 2001, BoA released her first mini-album, Don't Start Now; it sold around 90,000 units. After its release, she took a hiatus from the Korean music industry to focus on the Japanese market at which time she worked to solidify her skills in Japanese.

BoA began her Japanese music career singing at the Avex-owned club Velfarre. Her debut Japanese album, Listen to My Heart, was released on March 13, 2002. The album was a breakthrough in BoA's career, becoming an RIAJ-certified million-seller and debuted atop the Oricon, the first album by a Korean artist to do so. It was promoted with several singles: the Top 20 hit "ID; Peace B" (originally from the eponymous album), "Amazing Kiss", "Kimochi wa Tsutawaru", the Top 5 hit "Listen to My Heart," and the Top 10 "Every Heart: Minna no Kimochi". After the September 11, 2001 attacks, BoA recorded the charity single "The Meaning of Peace" with Kumi Koda as part of Avex's Song Nation project to raise funds for charity. From 2001 to 2007, BoA hosted Beat it BoA's World, a radio program on the Japan FM Network.

After the release of Listen to My Heart, BoA released her second Korean studio album, No. 1, a month later on April 12, 2002. The album sold around 544,853 units and became the fourth-best-selling record of the year in South Korea. Jumping into the World (a Japanese re-release of the mini-album Don't Start Now) and the Japanese single "Don't Start Now" were released a month later on the same day. At the end of the year, BoA released her second Korean mini-album Miracle.

BoA's second Japanese studio album, Valenti (January 2003), became her best-selling album, with over 1,249,000 copies sold. Three singles preceded its release: "Valenti," which peaked at the number-two position on the Oricon chart, "Kiseki / No.1" and "Jewel Song / Beside You: Boku o Yobu Koe", both which also peaked at the number-three position. In support of the album, BoA launched BoA 1st Live Tour Valenti, her first Japanese concert tour. Later in the same year, BoA released her third Korean-language studio album, Atlantis Princess on May 30, 2003 and then released a mini-album Shine We Are! on December 4, 2003.The former was the fifth-best-selling South Korean record of the year with around 345,000 units sold; the latter sold around 58,000 units.

2004–2008: New image, foray into China, and creative control
Her third Japanese studio album, Love & Honesty (January 2004) was a musical "change in direction": it contained a rock-dance song ("Rock with You") and "harder" R&B. Though the album failed to match Valenti in sales, it topped the Oricon chart for two weeks and became RIAJ-certified triple-platinum. In support of the album, BoA held a tour, Live Concert Tour 2004: Love & Honesty, spanning nine performances and attracted approximately 105,000 attendants. In contrast with 1st Live Tour, which "emphasized exotic Asian design", the Love & Honesty tour had an "outer-space, sci-fi" theme; among the props were a three-storey-high space ship and the robot Asimo. Her first compilation album, Best of Soul (February 2005), however, sold over a million copies, making BoA the first non-Japanese Asian singer to have two million-selling albums in Japan.

BoA reinvented her image for her fourth and fifth Korean albums, My Name (June 2004) and Girls on Top (June 2005), shedding the "cute" and "youthful" style that had characterized previous years and adopted a more "sexy" and "sultry" look. The sales of BoA's Korean albums began to decline: My Name sold 191,000 units and became the eleventh-best-selling South Korean album in 2004 while Girls on Top ranked fourteenth in 2005 with 113,000 units sold. In September 2004, BoA instigated controversy in Japan when she donated ₩50 million to a memorial project for Korean independence activist and nationalist An Jung-geun.

Her fourth Japanese studio album, Outgrow, (February 2006) reached the number-one spot on the Oricon chart for its first week of release, making it her fourth consecutive original Japanese album to do so. With 220,000 copies sold, it became her lowest-selling first-week debut for a studio album at that point. "Do the Motion", the first single from the album, reached the top spot, making her the fourth non-Japanese Asian to have a number-one single on the Oricon charts. "Merry Christmas from BoA" (2005), the album's last single, was the singer's first digital single. That May, BoA renewed her contract with SM Entertainment until 2012. At the time it was noted that she had a shareholding in the company of 100,000 (Approximately worth $1m USD). She also voiced Heather the possum in the Korean and Japanese version of the animated film Over the Hedge. On September 21, 2006, she released her first digital single in Korea, a Korean version of "Key of Heart".  In support of Outgrow, BoA launched a special Zepp tour, B0A The Live, on September 29, 2006, which lasted until October 29. She staged her first Christmas concert on December 7, 2006.

Three singles preceded BoA's fifth Japanese studio album, Made in Twenty (January 2007): the Top 3 "Nanairo no Ashita (Brand New Beat)/Your Color," the Top 10 "Key of Heart," and the No. 2 hit "Winter Love." The album, which contained R&B and dance songs as well as ballads, debuted at the top of the weekly Oricon charts, making the album her sixth in a row to do so (including one compilation). Having previously compose the song "No More Make Me Sick" for Made in Twenty, BoA assumed creative control over her sixth Japanese album, The Face (February 2008). The album debuted at the top of the weekly Oricon charts, making BoA one of only two artists in Japan to have six consecutive studio albums top the Oricon weekly charts (the other is Ayumi Hamasaki, who has eight consecutive number-one albums). On June 9, 2008, BoA and nine other artists from around the world recorded an English cover of Wei Wei's "Dedication of Love". Produced by Roald Hoffmann and Brian Alan, the single was used to raise funds for victims of the Sichuan earthquake. But due to a tight schedule, BoA was pulled back from this project. Korean jewelry brand Ramee also released, "Ramee by BoA", a line of jewelry designed by the singer herself.

2008–2012: American expansion and return to Asia
On September 2, 2008, it was announced that BoA would make her American debut under a new subsidiary label, SM Entertainment USA. Hoping to become a "world-renowned entertainer" in the vein of Janet Jackson, BoA's debut American single "Eat You Up," was produced by Thomas Troelsen, and released on October 21, 2008. It charted at No. 9 on the Billboard Hot Dance Club Play chart. To promote the single, BoA performed "Eat You Up" as well as other songs at YouTube's Tokyo Live concert, and performed in New York City on December 3, 2008, as well as the Jingle Ball at the Anaheim Honda Center on December 6, 2008. The following year, she released "Eien/Universe/Believe in Love" and was also featured in Ravex's single "Believe in Love."

BoA's self-titled English album was released in the U.S. on March 17 and featured tracks by producers Bloodshy and Avant as well as a duet with Sean Garrett. Her second Japanese compilation album, Best & USA was released on March 18 tying together a compilation of recent hits in Japan with her English-language debut. Though she stated that "[i]t has always been my dream to debut in America," she found English tougher to learn than Japanese and despite living in West Beverly Hills, found it difficult to make friends. BoA later headlined the San Francisco Pride Festival on June 28, 2009, alongside Solange Knowles and The Cliks, where she also performed the song "Energetic" for the first time in public, in addition to "Eat You Up" and "I Did It for Love."  On August 31, SM USA released BoA Deluxe, a repackaged version of her debut English album. The album contained two new tracks and the radio edit version of "Energetic".

With her U.S. career struggling to gain traction, BoA returned to East Asia to release her seventh Japanese album, Identity (February 2010).  Promoted by the singles "Bump Bump!" featuring Verbal from M-Flo and "Mamoritai: White Wishes" (December 2009), the album only charted at No. 4, selling 37,606 copies in its first week. With little promotion from her label, it ended her run of six consecutive No. 1 albums, suggesting that it would be impossible for her to sustain her career in three territories simultaneously. Her first Korean album in five years, Hurricane Venus, was released on August 5, 2010, and sold 55,776 units making it the 22nd best selling album in South Korea for 2010. She also represented South Korea and performed at the 7th Asia Song Festival, organized by Korea Foundation for International Culture Exchange, at the Seoul Olympic Stadium.

BoA made her Hollywood movie debut in the dance film Make Your Move 3D, playing the character Aya opposite Derek Hough. Although production ended in 2011, the film was released in 2013. The movie received mixed reviews, with Inkoo Kang of the Los Angeles Times praising the choreography but stating that "[w]henever actor Derek Hough and BoA stop leaping and twirling, [it] is an underwritten mess." To celebrate the 10th anniversary of her Japanese debut, BoA released "Milestone," which ranked at No. 4 on the Oricon Weekly Music-DVD charts. She also held her 10th anniversary concert on December 10–11 at Tokyo International Forum.

Following the concert, BoA shifted her activities to her native county, joining the judging panel on SBS's audition program K-pop Star as a representative of S.M. Entertainment, alongside Yang Hyun-suk from YG Entertainment and Park Jin-young from JYP Entertainment. BoA received praise for her ability as a judge with her insightful comments and discerning eyes, and also sang the theme song "One Dream." For her seventh Korean album, Only One (July 2012), BoA wrote and composed its title track, while its dance steps choreographed by NappyTabs, who has previously worked with BoA in Cobu. Upon its release, "Only One" achieved an all-kill on several music charts. She followed this up with the second "The Shadow," was released August 18, 2012. Additionally, she recorded the song "Lookin'" featuring The Quiett for Hyundai's 'Premium Younique Lifestyle' campaign.

2013–2015: Music production, television role, and 15th anniversary

BoA launched her first Korean tour with BoA Special Live 2013: Here I Am tour at the Olympic Hall, and released the song "Disturbance," which she wrote and composed, to commemorate her first concert tour in South Korea. In September 2013, BoA starred in KBS' two-episode drama special Expect to Date alongside Choi Daniel and Im Si-wan, her full first role in a drama, following a string of cameo appearances. She received praise for her acting performance. She also participated in Infinity Challenge's bi-annual song festival and was paired with Leessang's Gil, with the two co-produced the song "G.A.B". In March 2014, BoA was appointed as a de facto creative director in S.M. Entertainment, alongside labelmate Kangta; she was placed in charge of mental care of artists who debut at a young age.

The singles for BoA's eighth Japanese album, Who's Back? (September 2014), were released over a span of four years prior to the album's release:"Woo Weekend" and "I See Me" in 2010, "Milestone" in 2011, Only One," "Tail of Hope" and "Message / Call My Name" in 2013, and "Shout It Out" and "Masayume Chasing" in 2014. To promote the album, she embarked on her BoA Live Tour 2014 Who's Back? tour in September, her first Japanese tour in four years. After the tour concluded, BoA starred in her first Korean film, Big Match alongside Lee Jung-jae and Shin Ha-kyun though a Japanese single "Fly" was released on December 3, 2014.

Her eighth Korean album Kiss My Lips (May 2015) became her first entirely self-written, self-produced album, working alongside American producers The Underdogs and Stereotypes. The single "Who Are You" (feat. Gaeko) was released prior to the album's unveiling, along with its accompanying music video, which starred EXO's Sehun as the male lead. The rest of the album was unveiled on May 12 along with an official music video of the eponymous title track. Billboard called the singer a promising songwriter despite moments of musical blandness.

In July, she performed at the BoA Special Live 2015: Nowness to commemorate her 15th anniversary. The concert took place on August 22 and 23 at the Sejong Center for the Performing Arts in South Korea, making BoA the first female idol to hold a solo concert at the venue. This was followed by BoA Special Live 2015: Nowness in Japan which took place on December 11, 2015, at Tokyo International Forum Hall-A. Her 15th anniversary in Japan the following year was celebrated in a similar fashion, including the release of the song "Lookbook", and a 15th anniversary edition of BoA's Japanese Winter hit, "Meri Kuri." As part of S.M. Entertainment's special winter project, Winter Garden, BoA released a digital single entitled "Christmas Paradise."

2016–present: Musical projects, television production, and acting debut
On January 12, 2016, BoA released an English-language single "Make Me Complete", which serves as the theme song for the Fuji TV special drama Ooku, starring Sawajiri Erika and Watanabe Mayu. In June, she collaborated with Korean rapper Beenzino for S.M. Entertainment's SM Station project. The duo released the single "No Matter What," which ranked atop five domestic charts. BoA worked with BeatBurger for another SM Station single titled "Music Is Wonderful", where she participated in the composing and writing of the track. From October to November 2016, BoA starred in JTBC's romance melodrama Listen to Love, returning to the small screen after three years.

The following year, BoA became one of the producers for Mnet's boy group survival reality show, Produce 101 Season 2, which aired from April 7 to June 16. BoA later released another song for SM Station, "Spring Rain", an R&B number produced by Kenzie. In May, BoA embarked on her BoA The live in Billboard Live Tour, held in Tokyo and Osaka. She also released the single "Camo," a dance song with a heavy emphasis on bass and synthesizer sounds, which was a change in sound from her previous materials and produced by The Underdogs. In July, she released the Japanese single "Right Here, Right Everywhere" for the soundtrack of drama Yaneura no Koibito. She later starred in the film Autumn Sonata alongside Lee Hak-joo, playing a terminally ill patient.

In 2018, BoA returned to Japan and released her ninth Japanese album Watashi Konomama de Iinokana on February 14, 2018, followed by EP Unchained in March. To accompany the release of the EP, she embarked on the BoA The Live 2018: Unchained Tour from March 15 to April 4. People who attend the concerts received a copy of Unchained. On January 31, she released "Nega Dola", which served as a single for BoA's then-upcoming first extended play. The EP, One Shot, Two Shot, was released on February 20, alongside its titular lead single and the song's music video. The EP peaked at number six at the South Korean Gaon Album Chart and number seven at the Billboard World Albums Chart. On October 24, she released her ninth Korean album Woman alongside a lead single of the same name. The album peaked at number six at the Gaon Album Chart, number eleven at the Billboard World Albums Chart.

On June 4, 2019, she released the single "Feedback", which features rapper Nucksal, alongside the song's music video. BoA embarked on her #Mood Tour, which had six dates in Japan and two dates in Seoul, from September to October 2019. On October 23, she released a new Japanese single, "Wishing Well," which she earlier debuted on the tour. On December 11, 2019, she released her second extended play Starry Night.

In May 2020, BoA was featured as one of the coaches for the third season of The Voice of Korea, alongside Dynamic Duo, Sung Si-kyung, and Kim Jong-kook. On December 1, 2020, she released her tenth Korean album Better. SpoTV News shared BoA to join as a judge for Mnet Dance program "Street Woman Fighter". It is a female dance crew competition premiering in August 2021. On November 5, 2021, BoA released the Japanese single, "My Dear", to commemorate her 20th anniversary.

BoA was revealed as a member of the supergroup Got the Beat on December 27, 2021. The group debuted on January 3, 2022.

To celebrate her 20th anniversary, BoA released the Japanese compilation album The Greatest on May 30, 2022.

Image and artistry

BoA lists hip hop as her main musical influence, though she also enjoys R&B. Her favorite musicians are Whitney Houston, Michael Jackson, Justin Timberlake, and Ne-Yo; as a result, much of BoA's music is either dance-pop or R&B. Because she also sings ballads, she is often compared to Japanese singers Namie Amuro and Ayumi Hamasaki. Her debut album, ID; Peace B, contained urban pop, "slickly produced" ballads, and "upbeat dance tunes". As her career went on, she began experimenting with different styles: Valenti contained mostly ballads; Love and Honesty was an experiment with "harder" R&B and rock music. The Face was influenced by electropop and included "happy spring" songs ("Sweet Impact" and "Bad Drive"), a guitar-driven "groovy dance" song ("Lose Your Mind"), and ballads.  Because the composition and writing of BoA's songs is handled mostly by her staff, BoA has been criticized as being a "manufactured pop star". In response to such criticism, BoA said that "if one person were to force their own will on something, then things that should have gone right could easily go wrong" and that she is "not all that unhappy with the expression that [she is] a manufactured star. In a way, that is true. Because SM Entertainment created the environment and all the surrounding conditions, [she is] able to be successful in the way [she is] now." She later assumed creative control with The Face, while Kiss My Lips became her first entirely self-written, self-produced album.

BoA has collaborated with high-profile artists. Among the Japanese artists she has performed with are the hip hop group M-Flo (for the single "The Love Bug"), pop singer Kumi Koda, and house DJ Mondo Grosso. She has performed with Western artists: the song "Flying Without Wings" from her album Next World was a collaboration with Irish band Westlife covering the original song; the Bratz single "Show Me What You Got" was performed with Howie D of the American band Backstreet Boys. She also worked with Akon, singing the song "Beautiful", which was featured on the Japanese release of his third album, Freedom. Other artists she has collaborated with are Soul'd Out, Dabo, Verbal (of M-Flo), Rah-D, Seamo, TVXQ, Yutaka Furakawa (of the band Doping Panda), and Crystal Kay (for her single After Love: First Boyfriend/Girlfriend). American rock band Weezer covered "Meri Kuri" on the Japanese version of their album Weezer.

Endorsements 
Because of her wide appeal, BoA has appeared in advertisements for many brands. Among the brands she has promoted are Olympus, Lotte, Nike, L'Oréal, Japanese cosmetic company KOSÉ, Skechers, Audio-Technica, GM Daewoo and L'Occitane. Several of her songs have been used in affiliation with television shows. "Every Heart: Minna no Kimochi" was used as the ending theme for the anime InuYasha; "Beside You: Boku o Yobu Koe" was used as the opening theme for the anime Monkey Typhoon; "Key of Heart" was the theme song for the Japanese release of Over the Hedge; "Your Color" was the theme song of the video game Ninety-Nine Nights; "Mamoritai: White Wishes" was the theme song of the video game Tales of Graces,. "Tail of Hope" was used as the theme for the Japanese drama "Hakui no Namida," and "Masayume Chasing" was used as the 15th opening theme song for the anime "Fairy Tail."

In 2007, Anycall (a Samsung brand) signed BoA, Xiah (of TVXQ), Tablo (of Epik High), and jazz pianist Jin Bora onto "Anyband", a band created specifically to promote Anycall. The band released only one single, "AnyBand". In December 2010, she recorded "I See Me" for to promote Audio Technica headphones in Japan. The song "Woo Weekend" was used to promote Disney on Ice's 25th Anniversary in Japan while "Lookbook" served as the ending theme for the NTV Kei program Tokui to Goto to Uruwashi no SHELLEY ga Konya Kurabete Mimashita. In August 2017, it was announced that BoA was chosen as promotional ambassador for Jeju Biennale, an inaugural international art event on the resort island of Jeju. In Her widespread popularity has also made her a "cultural ambassador"; she has represented South Korea in inter-Asian musical events and has appeared in an Oxford University Press-published English-language textbook.

Impact

Dubbed the "Queen of K-pop", BoA is considered one of this century's top artists in East Asia; her popularity in the latter is attributed to her linguistic skills (she speaks and records in Japanese, Korean, and English) and a Japanese interest in Korean pop culture started in the early 2000s when the two countries began promoting cultural exchanges. BoA's popularity extends throughout East Asia; she has fans in China, Hong Kong, Singapore and Taiwan. She had expressed plans to enter a global market; in June 2006, the music video of her Korean song "My Name" became the first music video ever shown on MTV K, an MTV music channel directed at Korean Americans. In 2021, South China Morning Post estimated her net worth to be over US$25 million.

Though her earlier releases were marked by a "cute" and "youthful" style, BoA began to present a more "mature" image starting from the album My Name. In a Talk Asia interview, Anjali Rao noted that some felt that My Name marked the beginning of BoA's decline in popularity and asked if the public would always see the singer as "Little Baby BoA"; BoA replied, "So while I apologize to those people who still want the baby BoA, in fact, what can I do? I just keep growing up! I can't stop that from happening."

Various artists have cited BoA as an influence and role model, such as Girls' Generation's Taeyeon, Sunny, Tiffany, Hyoyeon, Seohyun, Shinee's Key, Exo's Sehun, Red Velvet's Irene, I.O.I's Chungha, Billlie's Tsuki, and Aespa's Karina and Winter.

Discography

Korean albums
 ID; Peace B (2000)
 No. 1 (2002)
 Atlantis Princess (2003)
 My Name (2004)
 Girls on Top (2005)
 Hurricane Venus (2010)
 Only One (2012)
 Kiss My Lips (2015)
 Woman (2018)
 Better (2020)

Japanese albums
 Listen to My Heart (2002)
 Valenti (2003)
 Love & Honesty (2004)
 Outgrow (2006)
 Made in Twenty (2007)
 The Face (2008)
 Identity (2010)
 Who's Back? (2014)
 Watashi Kono Mama de Ii no Kana (2018)

English albums
 BoA (2009)

Awards

Filmography

Film

Television drama

Television shows

Tours

See also 

 Contemporary culture of South Korea
 Korean Wave
 J-pop

Footnotes

References

External links 
 

 
1986 births
Living people
20th-century South Korean women singers
21st-century South Korean women singers
Avex Trax artists
English-language singers from South Korea
Grand Prize Seoul Music Award recipients
Japanese-language singers of South Korea
Mandarin-language singers of South Korea
Korean Mandopop singers
K-pop singers
MAMA Award winners
People from Gyeonggi Province
SM Entertainment artists
SM Town
South Korean child singers
South Korean dance musicians
South Korean expatriates in Japan
South Korean expatriates in the United States
South Korean expatriates in China
South Korean female idols
South Korean women pop singers
South Korean women singer-songwriters
South Korean film actresses
South Korean J-pop singers
South Korean rhythm and blues singers
South Korean singer-songwriters
South Korean television actresses
Synth-pop singers
World Music Awards winners